Grigoriopol District is an administrative district of Transnistria (de facto) in Moldova (de jure). It is located along the river Dniester, in the center of Transnsitria. The district contains two cities/towns and 14 communes (a total of 31 localities, including small villages/hamlets):
 

According to the 2004 Census in Transnistria, the population of the sub-district is 48,000, including 31,085 (64.76%) Moldovans, 7,332 (15.28%) Ukrainians, 8,333 (17.36%) Russians, 123 (0.26%) Gagauzians, 240 (0.50%) Bulgarians, 13 (0.03%) Roma, 26 (0.05%) Jews, 100 (0.21%) Poles, 187 (0.39%) Belarusians, 327 (0.68%) Germans, 62 (0.13%) Armenians, and 139 (0.29%) others and non-declared.

List of heads of the state administration of the Grigoriopol District and the town of Grigoriopol 
 Yan Viktorovich Vereshchak (? - 11 April 2014)
 Yuriy Valentinovich Larchenko (11 April 2014 - )

References

External links 
Map of Transnistria 
Grigoriopol, the Armenian Colony

 
Districts of Transnistria